Artūras Paulauskas  (born 23 August 1953 in Vilnius) is a Lithuanian politician. He was the Speaker of Seimas, the parliament of Lithuania, from 2000 to 2006, and he served as Acting President of Lithuania from 6 April 2004 to 12 July 2004.

Early career
Artūras Paulauskas graduated from Vilnius University with a degree in law in 1976. He then worked as an investigator and a prosecutor. He was Deputy Prosecutor General of Lithuania from 1987 to 1990 and Prosecutor General of Lithuania from 1990 to 1995. He was again Deputy Prosecutor General from 1995 to 1997 and was engaged in private legal practice from 1997 to 2000.

Political career
Artūras Paulauskas entered politics by running for President of Lithuania in the 1997–1998 elections. He was supported by outgoing President Algirdas Brazauskas and narrowly lost in the runoff to Valdas Adamkus, with Paulauskas gaining 49.6% of vote and Adamkus gaining 50.4%. He then established The New Union (Social Liberals) party, becoming its chairman on 25 April 1998. This party gained 19.6% of vote in the 2000 parliamentary election. Following this election, he became the Speaker of Seimas on 19 October 2000.

Following the impeachment of President Rolandas Paksas on 6 April 2004, Paulauskas served as acting President of Lithuania until early elections were held and a new president, Valdas Adamkus, was sworn on 12 July 2004.

On 11 April 2006, Paulauskas was removed from office as Speaker by 94 votes (only 11 parliamentarians voted against it). His party New Union (Social Liberals) did not participate in the election. Paulauskas was succeeded by Viktoras Muntianas.

Paulauskas was named as the candidate for the post of Minister of Environment by Prime Minister Gediminas Kirkilas on 30 January 2008. As Minister, he made a May 2008 statement at a meeting of the United Nations Commission on Sustainable Development supporting the use of renewable energy resources in Lithuania.

In 2015, news media reported that Paulauskas was included in a Russian blacklist of prominent people from the European Union who are not allowed to enter the country.

References

External links
  Biography from Seimas website.
  Personal website
  Artūras Paulauskas

|-

|-

|-

1953 births
Attorneys General of Lithuania
Environment ministers of Lithuania
Lawyers from Vilnius
Living people
Presidents of Lithuania
Speakers of the Seimas
Vilnius University alumni
21st-century Lithuanian politicians
20th-century Lithuanian lawyers
21st-century Lithuanian lawyers
Communist Party of Lithuania politicians
New Union (Social Liberals) politicians
Freedom and Justice politicians
Labour Party (Lithuania) politicians
Recipients of the Order of the White Star, 1st Class